The 2018 Australian Open was the eighth event of the 2018 ITTF World Tour. The event was organised by ITTF-Oceania, under the authority of the International Table Tennis Federation (ITTF). It was the fifth of six top-tier Platinum events on the tour, and took place from 26–29 July in Geelong, Australia.

Men's singles

Seeds

Draw

Top half

Bottom half

Finals

Women's singles

Seeds

Draw

Top half

Bottom half

Finals

Men's doubles

Seeds

Draw

Women's doubles

Seeds

Draw

Mixed doubles

Seeds

Draw

References

External links
 Tournament page on ITTF website

Australian Open
Australian Open (table tennis)
Table tennis competitions in Australia
International sports competitions hosted by Australia
Sport in Geelong
Australian Open (table tennis)